Diamond Brook, also known as Bass Brook, is a tributary of the Passaic River which flows south through a section of Bergen County in New Jersey, United States.  Heading up the brook from the Passaic River, one encounters the boroughs of Fair Lawn and Glen Rock, as well as the village of Ridgewood.

Description
Diamond Brook passes through a largely suburban setting, though its southern end runs under an industrial complex in Fair Lawn before terminating at the Passaic River.  The head of Diamond Brook is located south of Godwin Ave in Ridgewood, near the border of Midland Park.  Diamond Brook is considered part of the Goffle Brook drainage basin, but it has no junctions with Goffle Brook and is partly separated from it by another brook, Stevenson Brook, which flows south to the Passaic River between Goffle Brook and Diamond Brook in Hawthorne.

Another brook east of Diamond Brook, Little Diamond Brook, is considered to be in part of the same drainage basin as Diamond Brook.  Little Diamond Brook and Diamond Brook terminate at the Passaic River within about five hundred feet of each other.

History
Diamond Brook was historically known as Bass Brook. It once traveled through a series of springs and wetlands along the western edge of Glen Rock.  In the 21st century, only a few wetlands remain intact, with two preserved as parts of the Glen Rock Arboretum and Diamond Brook Park.  Some natural springs also remain intact behind Orchard School in Ridgewood.

In the 1870s, Diamond Brook’s gradation was sufficient to support a water wheel operated by the Marinus Lumber Mill in Glen Rock.  When the mill finally closed the wheel and its accompanying machinery were too cumbersome to move.  Today the wheel remains where it once operated, buried beneath the street near the intersection of Rock Road and the Boulevard.

See also
List of New Jersey rivers

References

External links
TopoQuest map depicting Diamond Brook
Glen Rock, NJ ~ Diamond Brook Greenway Guide
2007 Water Resources Data brief on USGS's Diamond Brook stream gage

Rivers of Bergen County, New Jersey
Tributaries of the Passaic River
Rivers of New Jersey